The EuroCup Basketball Finals MVP, previously also known as the ULEB Cup Finals MVP and the ULEB Eurocup Finals MVP, is the yearly MVP award of the finals of the 2nd-tier level professional basketball league in Europe, the EuroCup Basketball League. The EuroCup Basketball League is the European-wide professional basketball league that is one tier level below the top-tier EuroLeague.

The EuroCup Basketball Finals MVP award began with the EuroCup Basketball 2002–03 season. Dejan Tomašević was the first winner of the award.

EuroCup Basketball Finals MVP award winners
 Player nationality by national team.

 There was no awarding in the 2019–20, because the season was cancelled due to the coronavirus pandemic in Europe.

See also
 EuroCup awards
 EuroCup MVP
 EuroLeague Awards
 EuroLeague MVP
 EuroLeague Final Four MVP

References

External links
 EuroCup Basketball official site

EuroCup Basketball
European basketball awards
Basketball most valuable player awards

it:ULEB Eurocup Finals MVP